The Zee Cine Award Best Female Debut is chosen by the jury. They give awards to the new discoveries of Bollywood where they see some potential.

Winners
The winners are listed below:-

See also 
 Zee Cine Awards
 Bollywood
 Cinema of India

References

Zee Cine Awards
Film awards for debut actress